This is a list of highways maintained by the government of Quebec.

Autoroutes

The Autoroute system in Quebec is a network of expressways which operate under the same principle of controlled access as the Interstate Highway System in the United States or the 400-Series Highways in neighbouring Ontario.

(Montreal)
 (Quebec City)

Regional routes

South of the St. Lawrence River

North of the St. Lawrence River

Trans-Canada

The Trans-Canada Highway though Quebec does not have a distinct number, but rather piggybacks over the provincial highway system, mainly autoroutes, and is signed with the a numberless TCH shield next to the numbered provincial highway shield. As no single provincial highway crosses the entire province between Ontario and New Brunswick, the main Trans-Canada route follows (from east to west) Autoroutes 40, 25, 20 and 85; with A-85 being interspersed with Route 185 as construction to upgrade the latter to autoroute standards progresses.

Other significantly-long roads

Route de la Baie James (James Bay Road)
Route du Nord (North Road)
Route Transtaïga (Trans-Taiga Road)

References

External links

Transports Québec
autoroutes.info: "Ancienne numérotation du Québec"